Marquette Lake is a freshwater body of the unorganized territory of Lac-Ashuapmushuan, Quebec in the Regional County Municipality (RCM) Le Domaine-du-Roy, north-west of Saguenay-Lac-Saint-Jean administrative region, in province of Quebec, in Canada.

This lake is included in the Châteaufort and Marquette townships.

Forestry is the main economic activity of the sector. Recreational tourism activities come second.

The Forest Road R0212 (East-West) passes the north side of Marquette Lake. It will join to the East, the route 167 connecting Chibougamau and Saint-Félicien, Quebec, as well as the railway of the Canadian National Railway. Other secondary forest roads serve the vicinity of the lake.

The surface of Lac Marquette is usually frozen from early November to mid-May, however, safe ice circulation is generally from mid-November to mid-April.

Geography

Toponymy
The toponym "Lac Marquette" was formalized on October 5, 1982, by the Commission de toponymie du Québec, when it was created.

Notes and references

See also 

Lakes of Saguenay–Lac-Saint-Jean
Le Domaine-du-Roy Regional County Municipality